The Valencia CF Femenino 2017–18 season was the ninth season of the women's football section of Valencia CF. The team ended the championship in 5th position and was eliminated in the national cup's quarterfinals by league champion Atlético Madrid.

Season summary
The 2016–17 season had seen the team attain its best result in the championship yet, third position, and play for the first time in the club's main venue, the Mestalla Stadium. The ambitious project behind this successful season was reported as a personal initiative of president Lay Hoon Chan, but she resigned in mid-season due to the disappointing season by the men's team. The departure of manager Cristian Toro after five seasons was reported in May with one game remaining, and on 20 June, a few days after the team was eliminated in the Copa de la Reina's semifinals by FC Barcelona, his second in command Jesús Oliva was appointed his successor. Oliva, a coach at Valencia Femenino since the team's establishment in 2009, had been the manager of the club's B team that topped the 2015–16 Segunda División's Group 7.

Most of the previous season's key signings left the team, as Estefanía Banini and Yanara Aedo returned to Washington Spirit, and Christiane Endler was transferred to Paris Saint-Germain, with the €30,000 fee to Valencia the first paid transfer in Spanish women's football. Another notable loss was the departure of Claudia Zornoza, who left for Real Sociedad. Jennifer Vreugdenhil, coming from the Eredivisie, replaced Endler as the team's first-choice goalkeeper, and Valencia signed Noelia Bermúdez, Marta Carro, Sandra Hernández and Anair Lomba within the Primera División market. After the championship was underway the team was joined by Nadezhda Karpova, the first Russian to play in the Primera División.

Facing a harsh championship start, the team suffered more defeats in the six first games than in the whole previous campaign against top teams Athletic Bilbao, Atlético Madrid and Barcelona, and wasn't able to dislodge them from the three top positions for the remainder of the season. The team suffered a chain of injuries, and so in the winter window transfer Mandy van den Berg, who had finished her WSL campaign with Reading, was signed to make up for the long-time absences of Natalia Gaitán and Paula Nicart in the team's defense.

Unlike the previous season, the Valencia derby on 9 December was scheduled for the team's usual ground at the Ciudad Deportiva de Paterna rather than in the Mestalla, and it was reported in the media that the club intended to reserve its main venue for the male team. All political parties in the Valencian Courts issued an institutional statement demanding the club to allow the team to play in Mestalla. Hours later the club replied with a statement defending its social policies for gender equality and women's sport, regretting the criticisms as an alleged lack of awareness of its commitment and leaving an open door to eventual future appearances of the women's team in Mestalla. Months later, the away derby fixture was staged in Levante's main venue, the Ciutat de València Stadium, before a crowd of 14,000.

By mid-April, a seven games non-winning streak left Valencia in sixth position, with a 4 points advantage to defend in the last four games in order to qualify for the Copa de la Reina. Valencia won all four games and surpassed Betis in the table, ending fifth. The Cup's draw matched Valencia with league champion Atlético, which resulted in defeats in both games. One week later Jesús Oliva was sacked, but he stayed in the women's team as its academy's coordinator, while Óscar Suárez succeeded him as the team's new manager.

Transfers

Results

Pre-season

Primera División

Copa de la Reina

Primera División statistics

References

2017–18 in Spanish women's football
Valencia Femenino
Valencia CF Femenino seasons